Artem Ihorovych Tovkach (born 30 December 2002) is a Ukrainian professional footballer who plays as a right-back for Ukrainian club Kremin Kremenchuk.

References

External links
 
 
 

2002 births
Living people
Place of birth missing (living people)
Ukrainian footballers
Association football defenders
FC Zorya Luhansk players
FC Kremin Kremenchuk players
Ukrainian First League players